The 2010–11 World Series of Boxing is the inaugural edition of the World Series of Boxing. The event is organised by the International Boxing Association (AIBA).

Competition format

WSB regular season
The competition format consists of a team competition and an individual program. Teams of a minimum of 10 boxers represented 12 cities in three regional conferences: Asia, Europe and the Americas.

WSB matches consist of:
5 weight categories: bantam, light, middle, light heavy and heavy
5 bouts per match
5 rounds of 3 minutes per bout
Manual scoring

These teams competed in three conferences (Asia, Europe and the Americas) in the regular season, with the top team in each conference, plus the best runner-up from the conferences, qualifying for the play-offs.

The WSB season concludes with Individual Championships between the two top boxers in the individual ranking in each weight category at the end of the regular season. The WSB Individual Champions receive the titleholder's belt, 20000 US dollars in prize money and a qualification place for the London 2012 Summer Olympics

Teams
In its inaugural season, the World Series of Boxing consisted of 12 teams that spanned the globe. 

 Astana Arlans
 Baku Fires
 Beijing Dragons
 Dolce & Gabbana Milano Thunder
 Istanbulls
 Los Angeles Matadors
 Memphis Force
 Mexico Guerreros
 Miami Gallos
 Moscow Kremlin Bears
 Paris United
 Pohang Poseidons

Group stage

American Conference

Pools
Pool A (American Conference)

Pool B (Asian Conference)

Pool C (European Conference)

References

World Series of Boxing
2010 in boxing
2011 in boxing